Leif Persson (born 12 July 1968) is a Swedish freestyle skier. He competed at the 1992 Winter Olympics and the 1994 Winter Olympics.

References

External links
 

1968 births
Living people
Swedish male freestyle skiers
Olympic freestyle skiers of Sweden
Freestyle skiers at the 1992 Winter Olympics
Freestyle skiers at the 1994 Winter Olympics
People from Östersund
Sportspeople from Jämtland County
20th-century Swedish people